Francis Xavier Joseph Russell, Baron Russell of Killowen, PC, known as Frank Russell (2 July 1867 – 20 December 1946) was a British judge.

Early life and career at the bar 
The fourth son of Charles Russell, Baron Russell of Killowen, the Lord Chief Justice of England, and of Ellen Mulholland, Russell was educated at Beaumont College and Oriel College, Oxford, where he gained a First in Jurisprudence in 1890. He was active in the Oxford Union, and in 1887 made a speech in favour of Home Rule that led A. V. Dicey, an opponent of Home Rule, to write a letter of congratulations to his father.

He was called to the bar by Lincoln's Inn in 1893. He practised at the Chancery bar in the chambers of Mr Justice Joyce. In 1908 he was appointed King's Counsel. His practice was very successful, and in 1918 he became one of the 'specials' at the Chancery bar, i.e. a barrister who charged a £50 extra fee for any court appearance.

Judicial career 
In 1919 Russell, a Catholic, appeared in front of the House of Lords in Bourne v Keane [1919] AC 815, in which the Lords overtuned the rule that a bequest for masses for the dead was void for being "for superstitious uses". Lord Birkenhead, who had heard the case, was so impressed by Russell's performance that he arranged for him to be appointed to the Chancery Division of the High Court the same year. Unusually, upon appointment Russell declined the customary knighthood because, as the son of a peer, he outranked a knight bachelor.

In 1928 he was promoted to the Court of Appeal as a Lord Justice of Appeal. He was sworn of the Privy Council on 7 May 1928. A year later, on 18 November 1929, he was appointed Lord of Appeal in Ordinary and became a life peer as Baron Russell of Killowen, of Killowen in the County Down, the same his father already had and his son would have. He retired in 1946 for health reasons and died the same year.

Russell married at the Brompton Oratory on 17 February 1900 Mary Emily Ritchie, daughter of Charles Ritchie, 1st Baron Ritchie of Dundee. They had one son, Charles Ritchie Russell, Baron Russell of Killowen, also a Lord of Appeal in Ordinary.

Arms

References

1867 births
1946 deaths
Russell of Killowen
Members of the Judicial Committee of the Privy Council
Members of the Privy Council of the United Kingdom
People educated at Beaumont College
Alumni of Oriel College, Oxford
Members of Lincoln's Inn
British King's Counsel
British Roman Catholics
Lords Justices of Appeal
Chancery Division judges
Sons of life peers
Russell 1

Life peers created by George V